Gorua is a genus of moths of the family Erebidae. The genus was erected by Francis Walker in 1865.

Species
Gorua apicata (Holland, 1894) Sierra Leone, Togo, Gabon, Zaire
Gorua partita Walker, 1865 Sierra Leone, Togo, Gabon, Cameroon
Gorua polita Prout, 1921 Zaire, Ghana, Togo

References

Calpinae